Diemeniana frenchi is a species of cicada in the Cicadinae subfamily, native to Victoria and New South Wales in Australia. It was described by William Lucas Distant in 1907.

References

Cicadidae
Fauna of Victoria (Australia)